Momento Film is a production company based in Stockholm, Sweden. The company was founded by producer and director David Herdies to make documentaries and fiction films.

Productions 
 2019 - Transnistra (documentary)
 2018 - Hamada (documentary)
 2018 - Memory Games (co-production)
 2018 - Jauria (short)
 2018 - Horizon (co-production)
 2018 - My Heart Belongs to Daddy (documentary)
 2017 - Ouaga Girls (documentary)
 2017 - Lida (documentary)
 2016 - Miles of Sand (short)
 2016 - What Remains (short)
 2016 - Rust (short)
 2016 - Dear Kid (short)
 2016 - Circles (short)
 2016 - Yellow Brick Road (short)
 2016 - Madre (short)
 2016 - Fragility
 2015 - The Dybbuk. A Tale of Wandering Souls
 2015 - Winter Buoy
 2014 - :sv:Att skiljas (A Separation)
 2013 - While No One Is Watching
 2012 - Give Us the Money
 2011 - :sv:Gerillasonen (The Guerilla Son)

External links 
Momento Film at the Internet Movie Database
Momento Film Swedish Film Database

Film production companies of Sweden
Companies based in Stockholm
Entertainment companies established in 2011
2011 establishments in Sweden